In 2012, the La Jolla Playhouse generated nationwide controversy for the casting of a musical adaptation of Hans Christian Andersen's 1843 story "The Nightingale", set in ancient China. The play was part of the La Jolla Playhouse's "Page to Stage" program, a workshop series in which unfinished new works are tested and altered during the show's run. Two Asian-American actors were cast, and the remainder of the cast were African-American and Caucasian. The Asian American Theatre Community expressed their indignation on the lack of Asian-American actors cast.

The casting controversy generated significant response from the Asian American theater and artistic community, particularly because similar controversies have occurred in the past, as when Jonathan Pryce was cast to play the Eurasian lead in the 1989 musical, Miss Saigon.

During a public forum to address the debate, the idea for which having been generated by a letter of protest from the Asian American Performers' Action Coalition, Christopher Ashley, the current Artistic Director of the La Jolla Playhouse, stated that it was his effort to follow a multi-ethnic casting principle for the play. Ashley and director Moises Kaufman both expressed an understanding and acknowledgement of the criticisms, and clarified their ongoing focus, through the play's series of workshops, to explore multiple ways of telling the story through a multi-cultural lens. Kaufman later told the Los Angeles Times that his intention was to combine elements of both Eastern and Western cultures and that he was open to a version of the show with an all-Asian cast.

Speaking from the audience, book writer Steven Sater addressed the issue in depth. He stated that the play, based on the Danish fairy tale "The Nightingale" which is written by Hans Christian Andersen and set in ancient China, had gone through seven workshops "in a number of directions with a number of directors" over the course of its development, with each exploring his overall vision of the piece. He described his vision as comprising a blend of cultures with a focus on the mythical elements and heritage of the fable on which it was based, in lieu of traditional realism.

In 2003, the show's first workshop took place at the O'Neill Conference and utilized a multi-cultural cast, including an African-American actress playing the Empress Dowager, Wayne Wilcox and an Indian-American actor playing the Young Emperor, which Sater described as "a beautiful casting choice at the time" and demonstrative of the play being "always a story about enlightenment."

In 2007, the play was workshopped at the American Conservatory Theater in San Francisco with director James Lapine, and utilized an all-Asian cast. Sater acknowledged the significant part in the show's development process that this particular workshop played, saying:

It was a beautiful workshop of the piece. But we all came out of it feeling a number of things, one of which was that we felt, as white creators, we would not presume to know, or to tell, the story of Asia. We felt that the music which existed for the piece, and the storytelling, which more than anything else is informed by Shakespeare, really, is my influence, and coming from a Danish telling of the story. I wanted to tell a story that reflected the world in which I live, which is multi-cultural, and multi-ethnic. I still feel this.

During the forum, Sater acknowledged the sociopolitical issues arising out of the "longstanding inequities of the system in American theater" and the need "as an artist of social consciousness to be mindful of those issues and to address them." He stated, "When I began work on this show, it was in 2001. It was in the wake of 9/11 and what spoke to me in this story was the way The Song of the Human Heart could bring down the walls that divide us." Sater also expanded on his influences in writing the play, saying:

I also have to address what's in my heart, and my artistic vision for this piece. I think if art is anything, it exists to bring out the humanity in all of us and that is what we're trying to tell in the song of this bird, the nightingale, who brings out the humanity in a man whose heart has been closed and turned cold. We did not set out to do an all-Asian cast, an all-Asian version, and then give up on that idea. Rather, it's something we explored, as this cast is something we're exploring, on a piece that remains to be finished. I was writing for a vision that was in my mind, and that vision always was, and remains to be, multi-cultural, and multi-ethnic; and however imperfect its realization here may be, that's the vision I continue to embrace for the piece.

Composer Duncan Sheik stated in an interview after the panel that the discussion had "affected my thinking of the show. My head is spinning."

In 2011, the musical was workshopped at Vassar's Powerhouse Theater with a multi-ethnic cast (also directed by Kaufman).

Production information
Directed by Moisés Kaufman
Book and lyrics by Steven Sater
Music by Duncan Sheik

With Nikki Castillo, Bobby Steggert, Charlayne Woodard, Kimiko Glenn, Eisa Davis, Jonathan Hammond, Corbin Reid, Aaron Serotsky, Steve Gunderson, Matthew Patrick Davis, Chelsea Diggs-Smith and Zach Martens.

Performance dates: July 10 – August 5, 2012, Sheila and Hughes Potiker Theatre

References

2012 controversies in the United States
2012 in California
2012 in theatre
Hans Christian Andersen
Asian-American issues
Asian-American theatre
Cultural appropriation
Culture of San Diego
Race-related controversies in theatre
University of California, San Diego
Asian-American-related controversies